The M1870 Vetterli was the Italian service rifle from 1870-1891. In 1887, it would be modified into the repeating M1870/87 Italian Vetterli-Vitali variant. The Vetterli rifle used the 10.4mm Vetterli centrefire cartridge, at first loaded with black powder and later with smokeless powder. Some Vetterli rifles would later be converted into 6.5mm Carcano during World War I. Despite being supplanted by the Carcano rifle, it continued to see use in Italian service and abroad.

Development
In the aftermath of the Risorgimento, the Italian Army's service rifles were muzzleloaders converted to needle rifles  through a method developed by Salvatore Carcano. From 1869-1870, four infantry regiments and five Bersaglieri battalions trialed various bolt-action designs which used metallic cartridges. Among these was the Swiss Vetterli M1868, which the Italian government ultimately selected. However, the decision was made to make the rifles single-shot instead of retaining the tubular magazine of the original design. Some experimental examples were created by SIG before production began in Italy.

M1870
Italian state arsenals began producing the Vetterli from 1871. Rifles with varying differences were produced until the design was standardized in 1874. Five versions of the single-shot Vetterli were produced. The first of these were the infantry rifle and the cavalry carbine. A short rifle for special troops was introduced at some point before 1875. In the 1880s, variants of the carbine would be specially made for the Carabinieri and Corazzieri. In 1881, the rear sight would be replaced with the Vecchi sight.

M1870/87
From 1887 until 1896, the Italian Army converted M1870s into a four-shot repeating rifle, based on the system designed by Italian artillery captain, G. Vitali. This conversion added a box magazine fed from a steel and wood charger holding four cartridges, in the same caliber (10.4x47R mm) as before. The clip is pressed into the magazine, until the last round catches under the Cartridge retainer, and then the clip is withdrawn using the "pull string" in the top wooden frame of the clip. Clips of cartridges were supplied in a soldered sheet steel box, holding six clips. In 1890, the rear sight would again be modified to account for the smokeless version of the 10.4mm ammunition.

The conversion to the Vitali magazine was done on the long rifle, the TS (special troops musketoon) and possibly some of the Carabinieri carbines; No Vitali conversions were done to the Moschetto da Cavalleria for metropolitan Italian troops. In 1888, the Fondo Coloniale (Eritrea) requested 500 Vitali-converted Vetterli cavalry carbines for the Eritrean Native Cavalry ("spahi"—Swahili for "horse-soldier"). There are currently five known examples still in existence ( one in Australia, two in the US, two in Italy). Collectors refer to it as the M1870/88 V.V.Eritrean cav carbine.
The Regio Esercito (Royal Army) Cavalry units maintained the M1870 single shot Moschetto da cavalleria until replaced by the M1891 Moschetto da cavalleria in 1893.

The conversion is indicted by a cartouche "Artig. Fab. D'armi Terni 1888" (dates vary), on the butt stock. The center of the cartouche displays a Crest of Savoy and the word, Riparazione (Italian for repair) is directly below the cartouche. Shortages of small arms appeared from the very beginning of Italy’s entrance into World War I on the side of the Allies.

During the Home Rule Crisis, Frederick H. Crawford arranged the Larne gun-running operation. The Ulster Volunteer Force would acquire thousands of M1870/87 rifles from German arms dealers. The Irish Volunteers also acquired Vetterli rifles from similar German sources, albeit in much smaller numbers. By the 1920s, many of these Vetterlis had been brought to Britain. They would later furnish Officers' Training Corps to free up Lee-Enfield rifles during WWII, most notably at Shrewsbury School's OTC.

As more of the population mobilized for the first total war in European history, the supply of modern small arms fell short before the end of 1915 and a large number of obsolete Modello 1870/87 Vetterli-Vital were issued to newly formed regiments that were not expected to be in combat, however, troops carried these antiquated rifles into battle on several occasions.

As well, in 1916, Italy sent a large number of Vetterli-Vitali rifles to Russia; ammunition and components were contracted for by Britain to the Remington Armory. These "tsarist" rifles eventually ended up in Republican hands in the Spanish Civil War, as the Soviet Union emptied its depots of all the old black powder and early smokeless rifles it had inherited after the Bolshevik Revolution of 1917.

M1870/87/15
During World War I, many M1870/87 rifles were converted to share the same 6.5mm round as the primary service rifle, the M1891 Carcano, by adding a 6.5mm barrel lining and a modified M91 Carcano magazine. This barrel sleeving was called the "Salerno method"; The bolt face was also machined to accept the smaller diameter 6.5 mm cartridge head, and the firing pin shortened. These conversions were used for rear echelon troops (guards, training, etc.) and were rarely, if at all, fired with standard 6.5 mm military ball ammunition. After WWI, many of these rifles were assigned to Italy's colonies. These rifles were used again in the Second Italo-Ethiopian War, mostly by native African soldiers. This version would also be used by the Nationalist faction during the Spanish Civil War. During World War II, they were used only by fascist Blackshirts paramilitaries.

Users
: Supplied by Italy along with Carcano rifles during the Interwar period.
: At least 143,000 purchased between 1919 to 1924 during the Warlord Era. Predominately by Cao Kun and Wu Peifu.
: In 1884, 5,000 were sent to Menelik II. After the Italian defeat at the Battle of Adwa, at least 9,000 extra were captured. These would later be used by irregular forces in the 1930s resisting the second Italian invasion.
: Service rifle until the adoption of the Carcano.
: Still used by station masters in rural areas by the 1950s.
: Purchased surplus M1870/87/15 rifles during the Chaco War
: From 1915, approximately 400,000 M1870/87 rifles purchased with 31 million rounds of 10.35mm.
: Supplied by the USSR during the Civil War.
: Used M1870/87/15 rifles supplied by Fascist Italy.
: Some 1870/87 rifles were confiscated from the Ulster Defence Force and later issued to the Home Guard

Non-state actors
 Hellenic Macedonian Committee: Unknown number in use by 1905. Ioannis Ramnalis was photographed with an M1870 carbine in hand.
 Makhnovshchina: Supplied 3,000 rifles and 100,000 rounds of 10.35mm by the Bolsheviks in 1919.
Irish Volunteers: Approximately 1,000 purchased.
Ulster Volunteers: Acquired 25,000 along with three million rounds of 10.35mm.

Comparison with contemporary rifles

Gallery

Sources

Italian Vetterli MILITARY RIFLES IN THE AGE OF TRANSITION
M1870/87 Italian Vetterli-Vitali MILITARY RIFLES IN THE AGE OF TRANSITION
For the specifications and  the service history of the Italian Vetterli-Vitali rifles. M1870/87 and the M1870/87/15: , 
 First Italo-Ethiopian War, 
, 
, 
 , 
 

For amendments and additions (July 2, 2015) Typographical, Vitali clip design and function, Eritrean Cav.Carbine, Salerno method, Safety of Ball 6,5 ammunition: Personal examination and research by Dr. Astrid M.Vallati MD, JD. (DocAV) AV Ballistics Technical and Forensic Services, Brisbane, Australia. Rifles examined: M1870/87 Long Rifle, ex-Tsarist Russia, ex SCW; Moschetto TS M1870/87 AOI marked; Moschetto Cavalleria Eritrea M1870/88: Provenance Confirmed, Bringback to Australia, in 1928, by Surveyor-Gen. of Sudan; Acquired from grandson of same in 1990s, with Certificate of Sudan Service. Fucile M70/87/15 Cal. 6,5mm.

References

World War I Italian infantry weapons
Bolt-action rifles of Italy
Early rifles
Single-shot rifles